Major John Sewell Courtauld,  (30 August 1880 – 20 April 1942) was an English Conservative Party politician.

Family
John Sewell Courtauld (known as "Jack") was a member of the Courtauld family. The family came to England as Huguenot refugees and at one time engaged in the classical Huguenot occupation of being a silk-weaver in the Spitalfields district of London. However, they soon established the family company and moved out of London to Essex. For two centuries, the family has been associated with the Braintree area of Essex, in Pebmarsh, Halstead, Gosfield and Bocking. The silk and crepe manufacture thrived and the development of rayon and other artificial fibres made the company one of the leading textile companies in Britain, if not the world. The wealth that came with this success enabled many family members to pursue successful careers in politics and in the arts.

Jack Courtauld was the third son of Sydney Courtauld (10 March 1840 – 20 October 1899) and Sarah Lucy Sharpe (1844–1906). His eldest brother was Sir William Courtauld Bt., the first - and last - baronet; the second brother was Samuel Courtauld, who established the Courtauld Institute of Art; his youngest brother was Sir Stephen Courtauld Kt., the patron of Art Deco works at Eltham Palace.

Career
Jack Courtauld was educated at Rugby and King's College, Cambridge. He saw active service in the First World War. He took up his Commission in October 1914, becoming a 2nd Lieutenant in the 6th Battn. Somerset Light Infantry. He was in France in May, 1915 and served in the Ypres Salient until March 1916. He was at Arras until September, 1916, then going to the Somme until November 1916. He was awarded the Military Cross in December 1916. He was appointed Director of Army Accounts and Quartermaster General of the Division, and later served in Salonika. He was gazetted Major in 1917 and received the Croix-de-Guene avec Palme at the close of the Palestine campaign 

He owned a company of architects, but at the 1924 general election he was elected as Member of Parliament (MP) for the constituency of Chichester, a safe Conservative seat.  He was duly re-elected at the general elections of 1929, 1931 and 1935, until his death in 1942, aged 61. He had a London residence at 9 Grosvenor Square and in 1919 he acquired the Burton Park estate, West Sussex, within the Chichester constituency. He moved to a cottage on the estate after it was requisitioned by the Army at the start of the Second World War.

He was a breeder and owner of racehorses, and was an active member of the Jockey Club and Chairman of the Racecourse Betting Control Board 

He had a longstanding interest in film production and in 1934 became Chairman of the Directors of a new company, British National Films Ltd. Colleagues on the Board were Lady Yule, J. Arthur Rank and Managing Director John Corfield

References 

1880 births
1942 deaths
Conservative Party (UK) MPs for English constituencies
Recipients of the Military Cross
UK MPs 1924–1929
UK MPs 1929–1931
UK MPs 1931–1935
UK MPs 1935–1945
John
English people of French descent
English architects
English businesspeople
People from Bocking, Essex
British Army personnel of World War I
Somerset Light Infantry officers